Supermax is a television series created and directed by Daniel Burman and co-produced by Mediaset España Comunicación, Central Globo de Produção, Televisión Azteca, Teledoce, and Televisión Pública Argentina. The series follows the story of eight characters who purge their guilty for criminal acts they have committed in the past in a reality show recorded in an abandoned high security prison, where years before there was a big slaughter. It stars Santiago Segura, Cecilia Roth and Rubén Cortada.

The series premiered on September 15, 2017 on HBO Spain, later to be released on October 5, 2017 on Televisión Azteca.

Plot summary 
The series revolves around a maximum security prison that was the epicenter of a bloodshed in the 1990s, which caused its closure. Twenty years later, a producer decides to rent the space to produce an extreme reality show where eight eccentric people who are at a crossroads in their ordinary lives are chosen to play a game and find a way out.

Cast 
 Santiago Segura as Orlando Saslavsky 
 Cecilia Roth as Pamela Dalmasso
 Rubén Cortada as Mercurio Salgado
 Alejandro Camacho as El Ingeniero
 Antonio Birabent as Sandro Tifón
 Lucas Ferraro as Martín
 Juan Pablo Geretto as Muriel Santa Lucía
 Nicolás Gold as Augusto
 Felipe Hintze as Damián
 Alexia Moyano as Anette Gijon
 Laura Neiva as Sunny Days
 Laura Novoa as Lorna
 Guillermo Pfening as Rex Pardo
 César Troncoso as Cholo Bernaza

References

External links 
 

2017 Spanish television series debuts
Spanish-language television shows